Syllitus rectus is a species of Cerambycidae that occurs in Australia.

References

Beetles of Australia
Stenoderini
Taxa named by Edward Newman
Beetles described in 1841